The Delaware State Hornets baseball team is the varsity intercollegiate athletic team of the Delaware State University in Dover, Delaware, United States. The team competes in the National Collegiate Athletic Association's Division I and is a member of the Northeast Conference (NEC). Through the 2022 season, the Hornets had competed in the school's full-time home of the Mid-Eastern Athletic Conference (MEAC), but after that season, the MEAC merged its baseball league into that of the NEC. Delaware State and the three other MEAC members that sponsored baseball became NEC associate members in that sport.

Head coaches

References

External links
 Official website